Maria of Galicia (before 1293- 11 January 1341) was a princess of Galicia-Volhynia and a member of the Rurik Dynasty. She was sister to Leo II of Halych and Andrew of Halych, daughter of Yuri I of Galicia and his second wife, Euphemia of Kuyavia (d. 1308). She assisted her son king Boleslaus George II of Halych in ruling Galicia.
 
In 1323 her brothers Andrew of Galicia and Volynia and Lev II of Lutsk were killed, and she and her niece, Eufemia, Heiress of Volynia-Lutsk, inherited the lands. Her grandfather, Leo of Halych, had been king of Galicia 1269-1301 and he moved his capital from Galich (Halicz) to the newly founded city of Lviv (Lwow, Lemberg). She lived (before -1293-1341)

Her mother, Euphemia of Kuyavia, was the daughter of Casimir I of Kuyavia.  Before 1310, she married Duke Trojden I of Masovia with whom she had four children:

 Euphemia (1310-after 1373) married Casimir I, Duke of Cieszyn and had issue
 Boleslaw-Yuri II of Galicia (1308 - April 7, 1340), became King of Halych-Volhynia
 Siemowit III of Masovia (c1320-16 June 1381), became Duke of Masovia
 Casimir (1314-26 November 1355), Prince of Ciechanów and Warsaw

Ancestors

References

14th-century women
People from Galicia–Volhynia
1341 deaths
Year of birth unknown
Year of birth uncertain
People from Galicia (Eastern Europe)